This is the discography of French rock and roll singer Johnny Hallyday.

Studio and live albums

Posthumous albums

33 rpm, 10" (1960–1964)

Live

Unreleased live
2011: Johnny Hallyday 1960: À la Roche-Migennes (RDM Édition)	
2011: Live à l'Olympia: 1965 / 1966 (Universal)	
2012: Johnny Hallyday à l'Olympia (Vogue Olympia 1961)	
2012: Live Grenoble 1968 (Universal)	
2012: Live Olympia 1973 (Universal)	
2012: Festival Mondial de Rock'n'Roll 1961

Albums in other languages
1976: In Italiano
1982: Black es noir

Compilations

Singles

*Those with the note "Ultratip" did not appear in the official Belgian Ultratop 50 charts, but rather in the bubbling under Ultratip charts.

*² "Je te promets" originally peaked at number 6 in 1987, but re-entered at number 1 in 2017 on French sales chart.

** "J'en parlerai au diable" reached number one on the French sales chart, but peaked at number 11 on the Top Singles (Download + Streaming).  

*** "Pardonne-moi" reached number 3 on French sales chart, but peaked at number 22 on the Top Singles (Download + Streaming)

References

External links
 

Discographies of French artists
Rock music discographies